Marcus Alan Crocker is an English former professional footballer.

Career
He started as a youth player at Plymouth Argyle and progressed to the first team where he made his first senior start in the 1992–93 season. He made a total of 10 league appearances for Plymouth, and his last senior game for them was on 26 December 1994 against Swansea City. He joined Bath City on a month's loan in January 1995, scoring in his first three games for the club. He was released by Plymouth at the end of the 1994–95 season and joined Dorchester Town, later playing for St Blazey and Plymouth Parkway.

In April 2000 Crocker was playing for Tavistock.

By October 2001 he had rejoined Plymouth Parkway, from where he joined Newquay in December 2006.

References

External links

1974 births
Living people
Footballers from Plymouth, Devon
English footballers
Association football forwards
Plymouth Argyle F.C. players
Bath City F.C. players
Dorchester Town F.C. players
St Blazey A.F.C. players
Plymouth Parkway F.C. players
Tavistock A.F.C. players
Newquay A.F.C. players
English Football League players